Micromastery: Learn Small, Learn Fast and Find the Hidden Path to Happiness is a self-help book by British author, Robert Twigger, first published in 2017 by Penguin Life and in E-book format.

According to the author, micromastery is the practice of developing expertise and learning many small skills instead of aiming to become an expert in one area. Such skills may, for example, be producing decorative drawings, improving one's handwriting, making a perfect omelette, or growing a Bonsai tree.

Media coverage
  An interview with John Humphrys.

See also
 Polymath

References

External links
Author's official website
Author's TEDx Talk about Micromastery on YouTube

English non-fiction books
2017 non-fiction books
Self-help books
Penguin Books books